Petrillo is an Italian surname. Some people with this surname include:
Alessio De Petrillo, Italian football  player and coach
Andi Petrillo, Canadian hockey broadcaster
Ferdinando De Petrillo, Italian boxer who competed in the 1924 Summer Olympics
James Petrillo (1892–1984), leader of the American Federation of Musicians
Luigi Petrillo (1903–1964), Italian pentathlete
Sammy Petrillo (1934–2009), American comedian best known as a Jerry Lewis lookalike

Fictional characters
Sophia Petrillo, character played by Estelle Getty on the TV series The Golden Girls

See also
Petrillo (disambiguation)